Elisha Hume Brewster (September 10, 1871 – April 29, 1946) was a United States district judge of the United States District Court for the District of Massachusetts.

Education and career

Born in Worthington, Massachusetts, Brewster received a Bachelor of Laws from Boston University School of Law in 1896. He was private practice from 1896 to 1922, and was a member of the Massachusetts House of Representatives from 1902 to 1904.

Federal judicial service

On September 20, 1922, Brewster was nominated by President Warren G. Harding to a new seat on the United States District Court for the District of Massachusetts created by 42 Stat. 837. He was confirmed by the United States Senate on September 22, 1922, and received his commission the same day. He assumed senior status on October 14, 1941, serving in that capacity until his death on April 29, 1946, in Springfield, Massachusetts.

References

Sources
 

1871 births
1946 deaths
People from Worthington, Massachusetts
Members of the Massachusetts House of Representatives
Judges of the United States District Court for the District of Massachusetts
United States district court judges appointed by Warren G. Harding
20th-century American judges
Boston University School of Law alumni